The 1958–59 European Cup was the second edition of Europe's premier club handball tournament.

Knockout stage

Round 1

	

	

|}

Quarterfinals

	

|}

Semifinals

|}

Finals

|}

External links 
 EHF Champions League website
 1959 edition

EHF Champions League seasons
Champions League
Champions League